Chrysozephyrus nishikaze is a small butterfly in the family Lycaenidae. It is endemic to Taiwan. It lives on mountains. The larvae feed on Prunus campanulata.

References

D'Abrera, B., 1986. Butterflies of the Oriental Region. Part 3: Lycaenidae and Riodinidae.

Chrysozephyrus
Lepidoptera of Taiwan
Endemic fauna of Taiwan
Butterflies described in 1941